George Cranstoun, Lord Corehouse (28 November 1770 – 26 June 1850) was a Scottish advocate, judge and satirist.

Life
Cranstoun was likely born at his father's estate, Longwarton. He was baptised in Ancrum, Roxburghshire, Scotland, the second son of the Hon. George Cranstoun of Longwarton, seventh son of William Cranstoun, 5th Lord Cranstoun, and Maria, daughter of Thomas Brisbane of Brisbane, Ayrshire. He was originally intended for the military profession, however was admitted to the Faculty of Advocates on 2 February 1793, was appointed a depute-advocate in 1805, and sheriff-depute of Sutherland in 1806.

He was chosen dean of the Faculty of Advocates on 15 November 1823, and was raised to the bench on the death of Lord Hermand in 1826, under the title of Lord Corehouse, from his residence Corehouse near the fall of Corra Linn on the River Clyde.

In 1832–3 Lord Corehouse is listed as living at 12 Ainslie Place on the Moray Estate in Edinburgh's fashionable west end.

In January 1839, while apparently in perfect health, he was suddenly struck with paralysis, which compelled him to retire. He died 26 June 1850.

Associations and works
His accomplishments as a Greek scholar secured him the friendship of Lord Monboddo. While attending the civil law class in 1788 Cranstoun met Walter Scott, and a friendship continued through life. Scott read the opening stanzas of the Lay of the Last Minstrel to William Erskine and Cranstoun. While practising at the bar Cranstoun wrote a satire, 'The Diamond Beetle Case,’ in which he caricatured the manner and style of several of the judges in delivering their opinions.

Family
His second sister, Jane Anne, afterwards Countess of Purgstall, was a correspondent of Walter Scott, and his youngest, Helen D'Arcy, author of The Tears I shed must ever fall and wife of Dugald Stewart.

References

1770 births
1850 deaths
18th-century Scottish people
19th-century Scottish people
Place of birth missing
Corehouse
Scottish satirists
Deans of the Faculty of Advocates
Scholars of Greek language
Scottish scholars and academics
Scottish sheriffs